Krušćica may refer to:

 Kruščica, Konjic, a village in Bosnia and Herzegovina
 Krušćica, Vitez, a village in Bosnia and Herzegovina
 Lake Krušćica, a lake in Croatia

See also
 Kruščica (disambiguation)